DSAP may refer to:
Destination Service Access Point, a part of the IEEE 802.2 standard for local area network communication
Disseminated superficial actinic porokeratosis, a human skin condition possibly related to mutations in the gene SSH1
Durational Shortage Area Permit, a form of temporary teacher certification for subject areas with teacher shortages
Deputy Sheriffs' Association of Pennsylvania
Deutsche Sozialistische Arbeiterpartei in Polen, the German Socialist Workers' Party in Poland
German Social Democratic Workers Party in the Czechoslovak Republic (DSAP, Deutsche sozialdemokratische Arbeiterpartei in der Tschechoslowakischen Republik)